China Network Television (CNTV) was a Chinese state-owned national web-based TV broadcaster of China Central Television that was launched on December 28, 2009. CNTV International offered 6 local language services (Chinese, Mongolian in Mongol script, Tibetan, Kazakh, Uyghur and Korean) and 6 foreign language services (English, French, Spanish, Russian, Korean and Arabic). They also provided viewers with a host of news and feature programs from China Central Television's foreign channels.

CNTV had multiple specialty channels which focus on a wide variety of subjects, including news, business and sports.  according to Alexa Internet, the network's website was ranked no. 71 in the world.

CNTV was rebranded as China Central Television on January 1, 2017.

See also 

 China Global Television Network

References

External links
 CNTV Official Website

China Central Television
2016 disestablishments in China